Wanner Miller Moreno (born 22 July 1987 in Vigía del Fuerte) is a Colombian athlete specializing in the high jump. His personal best outdoors is 2.28 metres achieved in 2012 in Havana.

Personal bests
High jump: 2.28 m –  Havana, 27 May 2012
Triple jump: 15.56 m (wind: NWI) –  Medellín, 1 August 2008

Competition record

References

External links
 
Sports reference biography

1987 births
Living people
Colombian male high jumpers
Athletes (track and field) at the 2011 Pan American Games
Athletes (track and field) at the 2012 Summer Olympics
Olympic athletes of Colombia
Pan American Games competitors for Colombia
South American Games silver medalists for Colombia
South American Games medalists in athletics
Competitors at the 2006 South American Games
Central American and Caribbean Games bronze medalists for Colombia
Competitors at the 2010 Central American and Caribbean Games
Central American and Caribbean Games medalists in athletics
Sportspeople from Antioquia Department
20th-century Colombian people
21st-century Colombian people